The Mafinga Hills are a plateau covered by hills, situated on the border between Zambia and Malawi, in Southern Africa. These hills are composed of quartzites, phyllites and feldspathic sandstones of sedimentary origin.

It once formed a formidable barrier between the Northern and Eastern Provinces. Only very able 4-wheel drive vehicles are able to cross this area, especially during the rainy season.

The shortest road link between the two provinces is now eased by the rehabilitation of the Isoka-Muyombe Road, which traverses their lower slopes. As Muyombe is the district capital of the newly formed Mafinga District, any expedition to the Mafinga Hills would be wise to use Muyombe as a starting point (two guesthouses are available). Besides going through Isoka, Muyombe can also be accessed from the south via Chama, though this road passes briefly through Western Malawi's Vwasa Wildlife Reserve, or from the East via the Malawian town of Bolero on route S104. As there are no fueling stations near Muyombe, except for in Lundazi, Nakonde, or Rhumpi (Malawi). The Luangwa River, the major river of eastern Zambia, has its source in the Mafinga Hills.

See also
Geography of Malawi
Geography of Zambia
List of countries by highest point

References

External links
 Zambia High Point, Zambia/Malawi, Peakbagger.com.

Forest reserves of Malawi
Landforms of Zambia
Plateaus of Malawi
Malawi–Zambia border
Plateaus of Africa
Important Bird Areas of Zambia